Kanze may refer to:

Garzê Tibetan Autonomous Prefecture
The Kanze school of Noh theatre (観世)
Kanze Nobumitsu, a Noh playwright
Hideo Kanze, a 20th-century Noh actor